This is a list of current and former Roman Catholic churches in the Roman Catholic Archdiocese of St. Louis.

St. Louis

Other cities

References

 
St. Louis